Antipaxos is a small island (5 km²) in Greece, about  to the south of Paxos. It is administratively part of the municipality of Paxoi in Corfu regional unit in western Greece. , the resident population of the island was 20. Largely covered in vineyards, Antipaxos has several beaches and one harbour, Agrapidia.

It has three main beaches: Vrika (white sand), Mesovrika (pebbles) and Voutoumi (pebbles) and it can be reached by 15-minute ride with a sea-taxi from the port of Gaios in Paxos.

In fiction, it is the birthplace of Nadja of Antipaxos played by Natasia Demetriou in What We Do in the Shadows (TV series)

References

External links

 Antipaxos Greece – Everything You Need To Know

Islands of Greece
Islands of the Ionian Islands (region)
Landforms of Corfu (regional unit)
Populated places in Corfu (regional unit)